The 1989 Livingston Open was a men's tennis tournament played on outdoor hard courts that was part of the 1989 Nabisco Grand Prix. It was played at Newark Academy in Livingston, New Jersey in the United States from August 7 through August 14, 1989. Second-seeded Brad Gilbert won the singles title.

Finals

Singles

 Brad Gilbert defeated  Jason Stoltenberg 6–4, 6–4
 It was Gilbert's 3rd singles title of the year and the 15th of his career.

Doubles

 Tim Pawsat /  Tim Wilkison defeated  Kelly Evernden /  Sammy Giammalva Jr. 7–5, 6–3
 It was Pawsat's 3rd title of the year and the 5th of his career. It was Wilkison's 2nd title of the year and the 16th of his career.

References

External links
 ITF tournament edition details